Beaver Dunes Park is in Beaver County, Oklahoma, near the city of Beaver. Also located in Hackberry Bend is a one-room primitive cabin which sleeps four and can be reserved. Pioneer Campground is located adjacent to the ORV area. This campground has 13 RV sites with direct access to the dunes. Both campgrounds have a comfort station with hot showers. Dump station located at Hackberry Bend Campground. Both campgrounds have handicap accessibility. Another area of the park is Big Sandy picnic area. This area has a sand volleyball court, basketball goal, horseshoe pits, playground, nature trail, and two reservable shelters.

There are legends regarding strange occurrences at this place, going back to Spanish explorers.  Coronado’s journal cites three of his men disappearing into flashes of green light while exploring the tract.  There is a separate legend about the area being a UFO crash site.  The location, which has been compared to the Bermuda Triangle, has been referred to as “Shaman’s Portal.”

The tract was once a state park.  The State of Oklahoma announced in 2011 that the park would be closed at the end of Summer that year as a budget-cutting measure. Laurie Anderson of Beaver, Oklahoma protested to keep it open. The dunes were saved from closure shortly thereafter. On August 15, 2011, the park ownership was formally transferred to the City of Beaver.

References

State parks of Oklahoma
Protected areas of Beaver County, Oklahoma